The Board of Intermediate and Secondary Education, Chattogram is an autonomous organization, mainly responsible for holding two public examinations (SSC & HSC). The board started its operation in the year 1995. Later The Board started Holding JSC Exam After Announced by Authorities.

The present chairman of the board is Mustafa Kamrul Akhter.

Background
As per the ordinance of the board, The East Pakistan Intermediate and Secondary Education Ordinance, 1961 (East Pakistan Ordinance No. XXXIII of 1961) and its Section 3A(1), it is responsible for the organization, regulation, supervision, control and development of Intermediate, Secondary and Junior level public examinations of educational institutions within Chattogram, Cox's Bazar, Rangamati, Khagrachari & Bandarban districts.

District under Chattogram Education Board
Bandarban District
Chittagong District
Cox's Bazar District
Khagrachhari District
Rangamati Hill District

See also
 List of Intermediate and Secondary Education Boards in Bangladesh

References

 SSC Result 2020  Chittagong Board By Allresultnet. Retrieved 2020-02-12

External links
 Official website
 Directorate of Secondary and Higher Education in Bangladesh
 JSC Exam Chittagong Board
 Tech websiteNon-Gov. Chattogram Board Results

Education in Chittagong
Education Board in Bangladesh
Government boards of Bangladesh